Michael Stich was the defending champion, but lost in the final this year.

Wayne Ferreira won the title, defeating Stich 7–5, 7–6(8–6) in the final.

Seeds

  Boris Becker (first round)
  Yevgeny Kafelnikov (first round)
  Michael Stich (final)
  Wayne Ferreira (champion)
  Andrei Medvedev (first round)
  Stefan Edberg (quarterfinals)
  Bernd Karbacher (second round)
  Karel Nováček (first round)

Draw

Finals

Top half

Bottom half

External links
 Singles draw

Singles